Rhamphomyia umbripennis is a species of dance flies, in the fly family Empididae. It is included in the subgenus Holoclera of the genus Rhamphomyia. It is found in most of Europe, from Ireland east to Slovakia and from Fennoscandia south to Italy. In the northern part of the range it is found from Norway to central Russia.

References

External links
Fauna Europaea
Ecology of Commanster

Rhamphomyia
Asilomorph flies of Europe
Insects described in 1822